The Better Man is a lost 1914 silent film directed by William Powers and produced by Adolph Zukor. It was distributed on a State Rights basis.

Cast
William Courtleigh, Jr. - Reverend Mark Stebbing
Arthur Hoops - Reverend Lionel Barmore
Alice Claire Elliott - Margaret Wharton
Robert Broderick - Henry Wharton
William R. Randall - Penrod
Jack Henry - Clancy
D. Hogan - Spike
Morgan Thorpe - Bishop
Albert S. Howson - Wharton's Secretary

References

External links

1914 films
American silent feature films
Lost American films
Films based on American novels
Famous Players-Lasky films
American black-and-white films
1914 lost films
1910s American films